Kachal, Iran is a village in Sistan and Baluchestan Province, Iran.

Kachal in Iran may also refer to:
 Kachal, Ardabil